Cumpas is the municipal seat of Cumpas Municipality of the  Mexican state of Sonora.

References
 Enciclopedia de los Municipios de Mexico
 INEGI
 Gobierno de Sonora
 Social Economic Profile of Cumpas (in Spanish)

External links
Cumpas, Ayuntamiento Digital (Official Website of Cumpas, Sonora)

Populated places in Sonora